Army Sports Club Stadium may refer to:

 Army Sports Club Stadium (Lviv), Ukraine
 Army Sports Club Stadium (Odessa), Ukraine